The United Soccer Coaches (formerly known as the National Soccer Coaches Association of America (NSCAA)) is an organization of American soccer coaches founded in 1941. It is the largest soccer coaches organization in the world, with more than 30,000 members. It offers training courses for both beginning and experienced coaches and a wide range of award programs. Rare among sports organizations, it serves its sport for both men/boys and women/girls. Lynn Berling-Manuel is the current Chief Executive Officer. The NSCAA was rebranded as United Soccer Coaches on August 2, 2017.

Annual convention
The annual United Soccer Coaches Convention, known as "The World's Largest Annual Gathering of Soccer Coaches" is held in mid-January. The five-day event attracts more than 12,000 attendees for live field demonstration and lecture sessions, networking socials, coaching diploma training classes, and a large soccer-only trade show, with more than 300 companies displaying soccer equipment, technology and services.

As the group announced its new name in Chicago on August 2, 2017, it also listed the sites for the annual convention through 2032:

Philadelphia– 2018, 2023, 2026, 2030

Chicago– 2019, 2025, 2031

Baltimore– 2020, 2028, 2032

Anaheim– 2021, 2024, 2029

Kansas City– 2022, 2027

On August 26, 2020, the association announced that the 2021 United Soccer Coaches Convention would take place online, in a digital format. The 2021 Convention was originally scheduled to be held in Anaheim, California, but the organization decided to cancel the in-person event due to the COVID-19 pandemic.

Awards programs
United Soccer Coaches operates a wide variety of awards programs. These include:

College awards
 All-America teams 
 NCAA Division I men and women and Divisions II/III men and women
 NAIA men and women
 NCCAA Divisions I and II men and women
 Junior College Division I and III men and women
 Scholar All-America teams 
 NCAA Division I men and women and Divisions II/III men and women
 NAIA men and women
 NCCAA Divisions I and II men and women
 Junior College Division I and III men and women
 All-Region Awards
 NCAA Division I men and women and Divisions II/III men and women
 NAIA men and women
 Junior College Division I and III men and women
 National Player of the Year
 Division I men and women – Between 1996 and 1998, the NSCAA recognized an outstanding collegiate player of the year.  Since 1999, the NSCAA has coordinated its NCAA Division I Player of the Year program with the Missouri Athletic Club.  They now present the joint NSCAA/MAC Hermann Trophy to the outstanding men's and women's player of the year. 
 NCAA Divisions II/III men and women
 NAIA men and women
 NCCAA Divisions I and II men and women
 Junior College Division I and III men and women
 College Player Award of Distinction
 National Coach of the Year award
 NCAA Division I men and women and Divisions II/III men and women
 NAIA men and women
 NCCAA Divisions I and II men and women
 Junior College Division I and III men and women
 Regional Coach of the Year award
 NCAA Division I men and women and Divisions II/III men and women
  NAIA men and women
  NCCAA Divisions I and II men and women
 Junior College Division I and III men and women
 1 National Assistant Coach of the Year award
 4 Regional Assistant Coach of the Year awards
 Team Academic Award
 Awarded to all teams meeting the criteria
 Team Ethics and Sportsmanship
 Gold, Silver, or Bronze awards to all teams meeting the criteria
 Team Pinnacle Award
 Awarded to teams who have earned the "...Team Academic Award, earned a Team Ethics and Sportsmanship Award, and achieved a team winning percentage of .750 or higher during the season of the academic year for the award."
 Bill Jeffery Award
 Awarded annually to one individual for "...long-term service to collegiate soccer."
 High school awards
 All-America teams 
 Scholar All-America teams 
 All-Region Awards
 National Player of the Week
 State Player of the Week
 High School Coach of the Year
 1 National & 4 Regional awards
 High School Assistant Coach of the Year
 1 National & 4 Regional awards
 Robert W. "Robby" Robinson Award  supported by the American Youth Soccer Organization
 Awarded annually to one individual for "...long-term service to scholastic soccer."
 Senior Excellence Award
 Awarded to high school seniors nominated by their coaches to honor "...exceptional contributions to the team while exemplifying the finest attributes of a high school student-athlete."
 High School Team Academic Award
 Awarded to all teams meeting the criteria
High School Team Ethics and Sportsmanship
 Gold, Silver, or Bronze awards to all teams meeting the criteria
 Youth awards
 National Youth Coach of the Year
 Regional Youth Coaches of the Year
 Youth Coach Award of Excellence
 Charlotte Moran Award 
 Awarded annually to one individual who has "...raised youth soccer to new heights through his or her long-term dedication to the game."
 Youth Player Award of Excellence
 Youth Participation Certificate
 Awarded by coaches to their team members

Rankings
United Soccer Coaches also publishes weekly rankings for intercollegiate and high school soccer during the fall seasons and less frequently during the winter and spring high school seasons.

See also
 Soccer in the United States
 United Soccer Coaches Hall of Fame

Footnotes

External links
 
 Past NSCAA Presidents

 
1941 establishments in the United States
Sports organizations established in 1941